The Belvedere Hotel is a hotel located on Great Denmark Street in Dublin, Ireland. It operates primarily in three Georgian red-brick houses built in the 1770s, at 1-3 North Great George's Street, while the remainder of the property to the rear was constructed in the mid 2000s.

The hotel is owned by former Fianna Fáil TD Donie Cassidy and is currently managed under an operating agreement by Dalata Hotel Group, who market it under the "Maldron" brand, and as of 2020, it was rated as a 3-star grade hotel. In December 2021, Cassidy acquired Barry's hotel immediately opposite the Belvedere hotel for €8m.

References

Hotels in Dublin (city)